The visa policy of South Africa is how the South African government determines who may and may not enter South Africa. 
Visitors to South Africa must obtain a visa from one of the South African diplomatic missions unless they come from one of the visa-exempt countries, in which case they get a "Port of Entry Visa".  Visitors who require a visa must apply in person and provide biometric data.

All visitors must hold a passport that is valid for 1 month after departure and with one blank page (two if a visa is required).

The South African Government launched an e-Visa system, initially for 14 nationalities in February 2022.

As of February 2020, South Africa added Tunisia to the visa-free exemption list.

Visa policy map

Visa exemptions
Nationals of the following countries can enter South Africa without a visa:

90 days
Citizens of the following 55 countries/territories who hold valid national passports are allowed to stay in South Africa for up to 90 days without a visa:

1 – Visa exemption applies for holders of ordinary passports only.
2 – The maximum stay is 90 days per year for ordinary passport holders; this limit does not apply to non-ordinary passport holders.
3 – The maximum stay is 90 days per year for all passport holders.

30 days
Citizens of the following 28 countries/territories who hold valid national passports are not required to obtain South African visas for visits of up to 30 days:

1 – Visa exemption applies for holders of ordinary passports only.
2 - The maximum stay is 90 days per year for ordinary passport holders; this limit does not apply to non-ordinary passport holders.

eVisa
Citizens of the following 14 countries/territories who hold valid national passports may apply for eVisas online provided they will land at O. R. Tambo International Airport:

Non-ordinary passports
Citizens who are holders of diplomatic, official or service passports of the following countries do not require visas for visits of the indicated period and transit for up to 90 days (unless otherwise noted):

1 – 120 days
2 – 30 days

Visa exemption agreement was signed with Mali but not yet ratified.

Eligible international organizations
Individuals holding the following travel documents are not required to obtain South African visas for visits of 90 days or less:
 African Union laissez-passer
 Southern African Development Community (SADC) laissez-passer
Staff members of SADC who travel on SADC laissez-passer are exempt from visa requirements for bona fide official business visits of 90 days or less and transit.
 United Nations laissez-passer

Visa types
Visas issued by South Africa are for:
 Tourism or visits to family or friends
 Medical treatment
 Working in the entertainment industry
 Attending a conference
 Treaty conditions compliance
 Maritime crew
 Cultural, economic and social exchange programmes
 Transit

Temporary residence visas issued by South Africa are:
 Business visas
 Work visas
 Quota work visas
 General work visas
 Critical skills work visa
 Intra-company Transfer Work visa
 Corporate visas
 Study visas
 Exchange visas
 Retired persons' visa
 Relatives' visa
 Medical Treatment visa

e-Visa system 
The Department of Home Affairs announced during a parliamentary presentation on 18 February 2020 that a new e-Visa system would be introduced to simplify entrance into the country. The government department revealed that it had successfully trialled the e-Visa in Kenya, with further plans to extend this to India, Nigeria and China in the months following.

The pilot trials were conducted in November 2019. The estimated time for an e-Visa application process would take 20 minutes, according to Department of Home Affairs spokesperson Siya Qoza, granted that all the relevant travel documents are readily available.

Overstay consequences
It is a departure of a foreigner from South Africa on an expired visa that triggers an overstay.

A foreigner who remains in South Africa beyond the expiry of his/her visa and has not applied for a valid status is an illegal foreigner in terms of the South African Immigration Act.

An overstayer will upon departure be declared an undesirable person in terms of section 30(1)(f) of the Immigration Act.
 A foreigner who has overstayed less than 30 days the validity of his/her visa will be declared an undesirable person and banned for a period of 1 year. 
 A foreigner who has overstayed more than 30 days the validity of his/her visa will be declared an undesirable person and banned for a period of 5 years.
 A foreigner who overstayed twice in a period of 24 months (repeat offenders) will be declared and undesirable person and banned for a period of 2 years.
The ban does not simply expire over time and the restrictions placed against the foreigner need to be removed and/or the undesirability uplifted.
An undesirable person does not do not qualify for a port of entry visa, visa, admission into the Republic or a
permanent residence permit.

Minors
From 1 June 2015, all minors under the age of 18 travelling in and out of South Africa must hold, in addition to their passport, an unabridged birth certificate with particulars of both parents. The requirement applies to both domestic and foreign citizens. If the child is travelling with only one parent, an affidavit with the absent parent's consent is required. If the child is travelling with another adult and without both parents, an affidavit with consent of both parents must be produced. An unaccompanied minor, in addition to holding an affidavit and birth certificate, must provide the requisite information of the local South African host. The rule has been widely criticized by the tourism industry, but officials claimed that the rule was implemented to fight widespread human trafficking and unilateral child custody abuse in South Africa. By October 2016 over 13,000 tourists had been prevented from entering the country due to the unabridged birth certificate requirement, thus having a negative impact on the economy.

In September 2018 the Cabinet announced that they intend on scrapping this controversial requirement for children travelling.

Visitor statistics
Most visitors arriving to South Africa were from the following countries of nationality:

See also

 Visa requirements for South African citizens
 List of ports of entry in South Africa
 List of diplomatic missions of South Africa

References

South Africa
Foreign relations of South Africa